Kevin Malget (born 15 January 1991) is a Luxembourgish international footballer who plays club football for Swift Hesperange, as a centre back.

Career
On 1 June 2019 it was confirmed that Malget had joined Belgian club R.E. Virton.

Personal life
Malget's father, Théo, was also a footballer.

International career

International goals
Scores and results list Luxembourg's goal tally first.

References

1991 births
Living people
Luxembourgian footballers
Luxembourg international footballers
People from Wiltz
F91 Dudelange players
R.E. Virton players
Luxembourg National Division players
Expatriate footballers in Germany
Expatriate footballers in Belgium
Association football defenders
Luxembourgian expatriate footballers
Luxembourgian expatriate sportspeople in Germany
Luxembourgian expatriate sportspeople in Belgium